Autoba is a genus of moths of the family Erebidae. The genus was erected by Francis Walker in 1863.

Taxonomy
The genus has previously been classified in the subfamily Eustrotiinae of the family Noctuidae.

Species

References

Boletobiinae
Noctuoidea genera